Jerome Bech (born 1970) famous for his colourful paintings and sculptures. You can find his work on his Facebook : Jerome Bech

Early life
Bech was born in Amsterdam and grew up in Hoevelaken. He attended a Waldorf school, known for its foundation in Anthroposophy. In the 1980s he moved with his parents and brother close to Bergen, North Holland.

Career
Bech started his career in several areas but none satisfied him, until he found out he liked to paint and create objects of all kinds of materials. He was initially strongly influenced by the COBRA movement. Early in his career his talent was noticed by Lucebert, who saw one of Bech's first pieces and commented that whoever created it had talent which could be developed further as an independent artist. As an autodidactive artist, he developed his own style which has incorporated various objects — a brush, a chain — anything he can think of with his creative mind.

In 2003, Bech had an exposition in the Art Calvia Grand Casino at Mallorca, Spain.
From October 2006 to June 2007 Bech was one of the artists involved in the "Taste of art" project where diners at the t Jagershuis restaurant in Ouderkerk aan de Amstel dined off a plate he had designed and took the plate home.
In April 2007, Bech was involved in a project together with Harold van Geerestein in Muiden, The Netherlands.

Sources
 DZD Art Gallery
 Nederlandse Galerie Associatie
 Noball Kunstbemiddeling

References

 Nederlandse Galerie Associatie
 DZD art

External links
Artist's web site. Accessed 2008-01-08.
Zo blij als een kind (As happy as a kid). Article in Atelier'', 115''':21-24 (2005). Accessed 2008-01-08.
 Several works of Jerome Bech
Paintings of Jerome Bech
Dutch page about the Bergense school
Current Art Project of  17  artists among others Jerome Bech
Diner at the artist from Harold van Geerestein
Partners in Xpo Crime
Work in auction

1970 births
Living people
Dutch illustrators
Dutch graphic designers
Painters from Amsterdam
Dutch painters
Dutch male painters
Waldorf school alumni